The 1994 King's Cup was an invitational non-ranking snooker tournament held in Bangkok in December 1994. Billy Snaddon won the tournament by defeating Noppadon Noppachorn 8–4 in the final. 

Round-robin groups were held to produce qualifiers for the knockout stage. Suriya Suwannasing made the highest break of the tournament, 120, during the group stages. Noppachorn led 3–1 in the final, before Snaddon won seven of the next eight frames for victory.

Main draw
Players in bold denote match winners.

References

King's Cup (snooker)
1994 in snooker
1994 in Thai sport